Burnley Youth Theatre is a youth theatre at the heart of the community in Burnley, Lancashire. Generally established in 1973 it has created shows, tours and performances, including new and existing work. Working with young people from 0 to 18 (up to 25 with LDD), the theatre operates from its purpose-built theatre just next to Queens Park, Burnley, it was the first purpose-built youth theatre in the UK, and opened its doors in 2005.

Activities include drama workshops, dance workshops, production auditions, volunteering for front of house or technical duties, and working towards a qualification such as the Arts Award. These sessions run weekly alongside, education projects, work in the community and a range of arts-based activities. The theatre also works with a range of young people in outreach activities and partake in community cohesion work in Burnley. For more details check out Burnley Youth Theatre website.

History
Burnley Youth Theatre evolved out of the Burnley Inter-Schools Drama Group (established in September 1972). Almost immediately the group's name was shortened to Burnley Youth Theatre and ran as such throughout 1973. Burnley Youth Theatre formally established its own constitution in April 1974.  In its early years the Youth Theatre was run from various locations in Burnley, including the Deaf Institute on Hebrew Road. Most performances took place in the Towneley High School, now Unity Unity College, drama studio, with the last Burnley Youth theatre performance held there in June 1986. In 1978 the organisation moved onto its current site on Queens Park Road and worked from two wooden huts / sheds. The site had previously been home to the experimental theatre group Welfare State International. In 1983 as part of the government's Youth Opportunities Programme, one shed was converted into a theatre which opened in September 1983 with the musical Camelot. The shed was named the Quarry Theatre, due to the theatre sitting on the edge of the disused Bank Hall Colliery quarry site. The theatre remains on the same site today.

BYT (as Burnley Youth Theatre is affectionally known) depended on volunteers to ensure the successful running of the organisation.  However, in 1986, BYT employed its first part-time Artistic Director, Anthony Preston. On average, the theatre developed and delivered 6 to 10 shows annually at that time. In 1987 BYT were invited to form part of a welcome celebration to H.M. The Queen when she officially opened the Burnley Mechanics Theatre on 12th November 1987. The Mechanics hosted the BYT's large scale Christmas shows from 1994 until 2004.

The organisation took on its first full-time worker in 1997. As Artistic Director, Jacky Riddell worked towards the development of a range of activities, and the development of Burnley Youth Theatre as a charity and a company limited by guarantee. This meant that the organisation could begin to explore other means of generating funds. In 1999 it was given RFO status, and began receiving public funds.

In 2001 Lisa O'Neill became the first youth arts worker, and began working more extensively in the community, ensuring that young people who would not normally attend the youth theatre were able to benefit from the work that went on there. Throughout this period, a colossal effort was made to raise funds to develop a new building. In 2004, these efforts began to take shape. The organisation was awarded lottery funding and money from NWDA and the building began in earnest, with the new theatre opening its doors in June 2005, with playwright David Edgar being in attendance. Volunteer Alan Daiches who had previously worked at Burnley Leisure was instrumental, along with Moira Preston and Board of Directors Chair Andrew Walker, in building a permanent home for Burnley Youth Theatre. In recognition of his service the theatre studio was named 'The Alan Daiches Studio' in his honour.

When The Prince's Trust wished to host an awards ceremony in Burnley, the Burnley Youth Theatre was chosen. Artistic Director Andrew Raffle welcomed HRH The Prince of Wales on 21st February 2008 and gave him a tour of the building, along with Chair of the Board Colin Hardacre.

Playwright Julia Donaldson came to watch a performance of her book Bombs and Blackberries which was directed by Artistic Director Mandy Precious in March 2010.

When a flood and leaking roof caused the Burnley Youth Theatre to close from April 2018, BYT was warmly welcomed back to the new Drama Studio (Auditorium) of Unity College (formerly Towneley High School) as it presented the play Goodnight Mister Tom, the first time BYT had performed in the school since 1986. After repairs Burnley Youth Theatre was officially re-opened by Sir Ian McKellen on 23rd May 2019, when he unveiled a plaque and presented his one man show celebrating his life and his 80th Birthday.

Moira Preston Building
In 2013 the old wooden Burnley Youth Theatre building (the Quarry Theatre) had come to the end of its life and was demolished. Permission was given to build a second building with additional rehearsal space. The building officially opened on 29 March 2014 as The Moira Preston Building. This was in honour of Moira Preston who volunteered almost forty years of her life to the organisation.

Artistic Directors 
Gordon Simms - Artistic Director [1972 – 1974]
Mick Dawson - Artistic Director [1974 – 1986]
Anthony Preston - Artistic Director [1986 – 1997]
Gillian Longdon – Co. Artistic Director [1986 – 1987]
Heather Barclay - Associate Artistic Director [1987 – 1991]
Nick Maynard Associate Artistic Director [1991 – 1997]
Jacky Riddell - Artistic Director [1997 – 2005]
Lisa O’Neill - Associate Artistic Director [2005 – 2006]
Andrew Raffle - Artistic Director [2005 – 2009]
Mandy Precious - Artistic Director [2009 – 2014]
Karen Metcalfe (née Barnes)  - Artistic Director [2014 – (maternity leave 2019 – 2020 & 2021 - 2022) present]
Louise Harney – Interim Artistic Director [2019]
Anthony Preston – Interim Artistic Director [2019 – 2020]

Alumni include 
Paul Abbott (Writer / Producer - Work includes: [on television] Shameless, Coronation Street, Cracker), David Bardsley (Actor - Work includes: [on stage] Blood Brothers, Billy Elliot, [on television] Gentleman Jack), Anna Jane Casey (Actor - Work includes: [on stage] Grease, Chicago, Cabaret, Spamalot), Julia Howarth (Actor - Work includes: [on television] Coronation Street, Doctors, Call the Midwife), Jody Latham (Actor - Work includes: [on television] Shameless, Coronation Street, EastEnders), Joy Wilkinson (Writer - Work includes: [on television] Doctor Who, Doctors [on stage] Britain's Best Recruiting Sergeant, Fair and The Sweet Science of Bruising, [on radio] adaptations of a number of Agatha Christie books).

Burnley